Tim Wright, alias CoLD SToRAGE, is a Welsh video game music composer most known for his work in video game soundtracks such as Shadow of the Beast II, Agony, Lemmings, Wipeout and Colony Wars.

His first commercial works were created using the Amiga in the early 1990s and featured in computer games published by Psygnosis.

Wright left Sony in 1997 to form Jester Interactive with the key goal of developing music creation software for home consoles. In his role as creative director at Jester, he designed Music and Music 2000 for the PlayStation and MTV, along with Music Generator and Music 3000 for the PlayStation 2 before leaving along with his brothers to form Checkmate Solutions Limited.

At Checkmate, Wright developed several musical sequencing products for Empire Interactive plc. under the eJay brand. After several products were developed, Wright left to form his own company, Tantrumedia Limited.

Wright currently manages Tantrumedia Limited and their audio division where he composes music, designs music sequencing software and oversees the production of websites and other multimedia projects.

Career
While working as a computer programmer for Littlewoods/Index the Catalogue Shop in the late 1980s, Wright penned compositions for computer-based demos. One of these, entitled "Puggs in Space", caught the eye of Psygnosis' then managing director, Ian Hetherington. This led to Wright creating music for a number of Psygnosis' Amiga and Atari ST games, some of which won awards. This initial freelance work eventually led to him leaving his programming job for Littlewoods and going to work full-time at Psygnosis. as their senior sound artist on projects such as Lemmings, Wipeout, Wipeout 2097 and Colony Wars.

Leaving Psygnosis in 1997, Wright was involved in the formation of Jester Interactive Ltd., with the intention of bringing music creation and mixing to Sony's original PlayStation console. The MUSICtm and MTV Music Generator series received industry awards & accolades, and spawned several incarnations of the MUSICtm Software before Wright finally departed with his brother Lee to form Checkmate Solutions Limited to design a new range of eJay music sequencing software.

In 2003, Wright formed his own multimedia company called Tantrumedia Ltd., involved in web space provision, website creation, software production, design & print and music. He also set up an official website to host much of his musical output under the name.

In 2005, as well as releasing the CoLD_SToRAGE double album Melt, he designed a new version of the dance & hip hop eJay music software for Empire Interactive, and made a return to Wipeout, this time for the Sony PSP with Wipeout Pure.

2006 saw Wright create more music for games, this time on the Nintendo DS, PSP and PC for forthcoming titles.

In 2008, Wright released his Android Child and Cold Storage HD albums.

In 2009, Wright penned music for more games on the DS, Wii and PlayStation 3, most notably Gravity Crash. He also released his fourth studio album, entitled Project Moonbounce 2009, which features sounds created by bouncing radio signals off the moon as part of World Moonbounce or EME (Earth Moon Earth) day.

The soundtrack album to Gravity Crash was released in 2010 and is Wright's fifth studio album, entitled Gravity Crash Anthems. This is quickly followed by his sixth studio album, Tik Tak.

Wright created his longest track ever, "Tangerine", which weighs in at 9 minutes and 31 seconds. This track is given away free to anyone who participates in the 2010 Cold Storage Easter Promotion, and as such is a limited edition download, unavailable in the public domain (this track was finally released to all on the Bandcamp service at Easter 2015).

Early in his career Wright was the victim of plagiarism, keyboardist Stian Aarstad copied the title track of the Amiga game "Agony" when he was recording an album with Norwegian band "Dimmu Borgir", Aarstad also stole from other Artists for this album.  Wright was not compensated for this plagiarism.

Awards and accolades
 Golden_Joystick_Awards 1995 : "Best Game Music - WipEout on Sony PlayStation" 
 Golden Joystick Awards 1997 : "Best Sounding Game - WipEout 2097 on Sony PlayStation" 
 Official PlayStation Magazine Awards 1999 : "MUSICtm - Most Innovative Game"
 Sony Computer Entertainment America Awards 2000 : "MTV Music Generator - Most Innovative Game"
 BAFTA Nomination 2000: "Interface Design : MUSIC 2000 by Jester Interactive"
 Remix64 ROTY Awards 2015: "Best Newcomer (C64 or AMIGA) CoLD SToRAGE"

Personal life
Tim Wright spent his formative years attending the nearby Llanfynydd County Primary School, a Welsh first-language school. He exhibited musical aspirations at the age of three, singing self-penned songs into a portable cassette recorder. At the age of five he moved with his family to a farm just outside Henllan. At the age of seven, he began attending weekly formal piano lessons. Wright lived on the farm with his mother, father and four siblings until he was 18, attending both Henllan County Primary School and Denbigh High School.

In his early teens he formed a short lived band called TUCAN with a fellow student. After completing his A-level examinations, he moved away to attend the Polytechnic of North London, where he studied Electronics and Communications Engineering for two years. Whilst at college, he also formed another two-man band in the shape of the snappily named Infinite Remix III Jnr.

Upon his return to Wales after his studies, he worked for six months at Sharp Manufacturing UK in Llay near Wrexham, but quickly moved on to work for Littlewoods in Liverpool, where he was part of the core team that programmed the in-house software for Index The Catalogue Shop. It was soon after moving to the Wirral that he also met and eventually married his first wife Michelle.

Leaving Littlewoods, he spent four years at Psygnosis before leaving to form Jester Interactive with his brother in 1997. It was around this time that he also met his second wife Claire, and just over a year later, their son Jacob was born. 2003 saw Wright leave Jester to form Checkmate Solutions Limited again with his brother Lee. In 2006, Checkmate Solutions Limited was dissolved leaving Wright to manage Tantrumedia Limited, a company he originally incorporated in 2003 as a vehicle for his work on websites and music production.

In 2016, Wright departed the UK and moved to Switzerland, where he now works for Numfum GmbH as their head of Studio.

Video games
 Awesome (Amiga, 1990)
 Carthage (Amiga, 1990)
 Tentacle (Eldritch the Cat, Amiga, 1990)
 The Killing Game Show / Fatal Rewind [FMV Intro] (Amiga, 1990)
 Lemmings (Amiga, 1990)
 Shadow of the Beast 2 (Amiga, 1990)
 Armour-Geddon (Amiga, 1990)
 Powermonger (Amiga, 1990)
 Leander / Galahad (Amiga, 1991)
 Amnios (Amiga, 1991)
 Lost Soul ([[Atari ST, 1991)
 Agony (Amiga, 1992)
 Aquaventura (Amiga, 1992)
 Shadow of the Beast 3 (Amiga, 1992)
 Lemmings & Oh No! More Lemmings (Amiga, PC, Macintosh, PlayStation, 1992)
 Holiday Lemmings (Amiga, DOS, Macintosh, 1992)
 Puggsy (Amiga, 1993)
 Last Action Hero (Mega-CD, 1993)
 Combat Air Patrol (PC, 1993)
 Phoenix Rising (Mega-CD, 1993)
 Sensible Soccer (Mega-CD, 1993)
 Mary Shelley's Frankenstein (Mega-CD, 1994)
 Bram Stoker's Dracula (Mega-CD, 1994)
 Microcosm (Amiga CD32, 1994)
 No Escape (Mega-CD, 1994)
 Mickey Mania (Mega-CD, 1994)
 Magician's Castle (Amiga, 1994)
 Championship Soccer 94 (MegaCD, 1994)
 Wipeout (PlayStation, Sega Saturn, PC, 1995)
 Flink (Amiga CD32, Sega Mega Drive, Sega Mega-CD, 1995)
 Wipeout 2097 (Amiga, PlayStation, Sega Saturn, PC, 1996)
 Krazy Ivan (PlayStation, Sega Saturn, PC, 1996)
 Formula One (PlayStation, PC, 1996)
 Adidas PowerSport Soccer (PlayStation, 1996)
 Lemmings for Windows 95 & Lemmings Paintball (PC, 1996)
 Adidas PowerSport Soccer International 97 (PlayStation, 1997)
 Chomper (Psion 3, Psion 5, Psion Revo, 1997)
 Thunder Truck Rally (PlayStation, PC, 1997)
 Codename: Tenka (PlayStation, 1997)
 Colony Wars (PlayStation, 1997)
 Brainless (PlayStation, 1998)
 WipEout64 (N64, 1998)
 MUSIC: Music Creation for the PlayStation (PlayStation, 1998)
 Tellurian Defence (PC, 1999)
 Music 2000 / MTV Music Generator (PlayStation, PC, 1999)
 MTV Music Generator 2 (PS2, 2001)
 Supertruck Racing (PS2, 2002)
 Pocket Music (Game Boy Color, Game Boy Advance, 2002)
 Music 2002 Slinky Club Edition (PC, 2002)
 Music 3000 / Funkmaster Flex's Digital Hitz Factory (PS2, 2003)
 Jet Set Willy (J2ME, 2004)
 Wipeout Pure (PlayStation Portable, 2005)
 Ring Factory (PC, 2005)
 Dance eJay 7 (PC, 2005)
 HipHop eJay 6 (PC, 2005)
 Techno eJay 5 (PC, 2006)
 R&B eJay 1 (PC, 2007)
 eJay Virtual Music Studio (PC, 2007)
 Sudoku (NDS, 2007)
 TT Superbike Legends (PS2, 2008)
 eJay eQuality (PC, 2008)
 Spellbound Party (Wii, 2009)
 Spellbound (NDS, 2009)
 Gravity Crash (PS3/PSP, 2009)
 Sonic & Sega All-Stars Racing (Xbox 360/PS3/Wii/DS/PC/Mobile, 2010)
 Skillz (Xbox/PC, 2010)
 Sodium 2 (PS3, 2011)
 Psychroma (iOS, 2011)
 Extreme Bingo (Facebook, 2012)
 Adventure Dungeon (iOS, 2012)
 Travel Bug (PS Vita, 2012)
 Boxbeats (PS3, 2012)
 Table Top Racing (iOS, 2013)
 Write Your Own Music (Xbox 360, 2013)
 Slipstream GX (PC, 2013)
 Table Top Racing (Android/PSVita, 2014)
 Gravity Crash (PS Vita, 2014)
 Dynablaster Revenge (PC, 2014)
 Gravity Crash Ultra (PS4/PS Vita, 2014)
 Pacer (PS4/Xbox One/PC, 2020)

Discography

Albums
 MELT (Digital Album, 2005)
 ANDROID CHILD (Digital Album, 2008)
 Gravity Crash Anthems (Digital Album, 2010)
 Tik Tak (Digital Album, 2010)
 AMIGA Revisited 2011 (5 track Digital Album, 2011)
 Chipfest 6 - The Rehearsal Tapes (6 track Digital Album, 2011)
 6E 61 32 (Digital Album, 2011)
 MUSICtm Demo Tracks (26 track Digital Album, 2012 )
 SLIPSTREAM Volume One (12 track re-master Digital Album, 2012)
 SLIPSTREAM Volume Two (18 track re-master Digital Album, 2012)
 STRIX MEMORIA ◔ ( Psygnosis Commemorative USB Memory Stick Album, 2013)
 DECADE ( Boxed USB Stick: 14 Albums, 11 Singles & Bonus Material, 2014)
 Overdrive Collection (10 Track 'Best of' Digital Album for REMUTE 'Does Time Really Exist?' Bundle, 2014)
 SHADOW OF THE BEAST (CD Album released by Bitmap Books : Remixes of AMIGA music originally composed by David Whittaker, 2015)
 Radiophonika (10 track Experimental Digital Album, 2015)
 Shadow of The Beast MMXV (13 track Digital Album, 2016)
 Ch'illout" (17 track Digital Album, 2018)
 Lemmings (12 track Digital Album, 2021)

Singles and EPs
 Henllan School Centenary (CD Single: Short Run Welsh/English, 2004)
 Albino 2 - The Red Eye Mix (Digital Single, 2008)
 Gravity Crash (Virtual Vinyl Digital Single) (Single, 2009)
 Rubber Band Boogie Woogie (Experimental Digital Single using only Rubber Band Samples, 2009)
 Smile Inside (Digital Single, 2009)
 Dancing Dad - Christmas Hero! (Digital Single, 2009)
 Tangerine (Limited Edition Digital ingle - Easter Sale Promotion, 2010)
 Yin+Yang (Double 'A' Side Digital Single, 2010)
 Escape from Barkhaven (Digital Single A & B Side, 2011)
 Evolution (Dirty War) (Digital Single, 2011)
 CANADA E.P. (Digital Single A & B Side, 2012)
 Orpheus - per due pianisti (Digital Single, 2012)
 Outersphere (I Feel So Alive!) / Boomerang (Double 'A' Digital Side Single, 2012)
 Torvolution (Digital Single, 2013)
 Beastly Adventures (2 track Digital E.P., 2013)
 New Year Song, "Here we are again..." (Digital Single, 2013)
 Brain Trainer - Hoopla Boopla Mix (Digital Single, 2015)
 CANADA - tilt shift EDM mix 2015 (Free Digital Single on soundcloud.com, 2015)
 Momentus (Digital Single, 2015)
 Onyx - Brechdan Araf Mix (Digital Single, 2018)
 DRIFT (Digital EP on Bandcamp, 2021)

Appearances on compilation albums
 XTM - The Game Mix (CD Album, 1993)
 CD Consoles - LE MAGAZINE DES SCREENAGERS: Music Collector 1 (CD Album, 1996)
 JOYPAD - le mag des consoles: Joypad CD LE BEST OF DE PSYGNOSIS (CD Album, 1997)
 Psygnosis: The Future Is Now (CD Album, 1997)
 Amiga Immortal 2 (CD Album, 2002)
 WipEout Pure: The Official Soundtrack (CD Album, 2005)
 Amiga Immortal 3 (CD Album, 2006)
 Amiga Immortal 4 (CD Album, 2011)
 Velocity Ultra (Soundtrack Remix CD Album - Track #8, 2013)
 Paula Agnus Denise (CD Album released by 010101 Music (ZOZ-1-CD), 2013)
 B.F.O. Drift [ Polka Dot Mix ] (Digital Album - Track #17 : "The Sound of SceneSat Volume 3", 2014)
 Blank (Video Game Heroes - Dolby Surround CD/DVD Album - Various Artists, 2014)
 Ski or Die (Digital Album - Track #4 'Super VG Christmas Party' by Various Artists, 2014)
 Determination (Bob Reynolds Sax Mix) (Digital Album - Track #35 : "The Sound of SceneSat Volume 4", 2018)
 Xanderful (Digital Album - Track #38 : "The Sound of SceneSat Volume 5", 2019)

Covers and remixes
 Crazy Comets UpMix (CD Quality cover version of Commodore 64 'Crazy Comets' by Rob Hubbard, 2015)
 Ocean Loader v2 - Upmix (CD Quality cover version of Commodore 64 'Ocean Loader v2' by Martin Galway, 2015)
 Kid Gloves [ Castle ] The Toe-tapper's Up-Mix (CD Quality cover version of Commodore AMIGA 'Kid Gloves - castle theme' by Tim Bartlett, 2015)
 Risky Woods - "El Pueblo" Cover Version (CD Quality cover version of Commodore AMIGA 'Risky Woods - El Pueblo theme' by Jose A. Martin, 2015)
 Cream of the Earth ( CoLD SToRAGE vs. Romeo Knight ) (CD Quality cover version of Commodore AMIGA 'Cream of the Earth demo tune' by Romeo Knight, 2015)
 Super Twintris "Those 3" Tunes Up-Mix (CD Quality cover version of Commodore AMIGA 'Super Twintris - theme tune' by Tor Bernhard Gausen, 2015)
 Scorched Tanks - Horizon's Edge theme cover version / Stardust - tunnel theme cover version / Guardian title theme cover version (3 tracks on a 35 track CD Audio Album - "Amiga Power: The Album With Attitude", 2019).

Film scores and soundtracks
 Traveller: RED (Merkelbach Films, 2006)

Public appearances

References

External links

 
 DiscOgs Page
 Tim Wright profile on MobyGames
 
 

Living people
Amiga people
British expatriates in Switzerland
Welsh composers
Welsh male composers
People from Wrexham
Tracker musicians
Video game composers
20th-century British composers
21st-century British composers
20th-century British male musicians
21st-century British male musicians
Alumni of the University of North London
Year of birth missing (living people)